This page lists all described species of the spider family Scytodidae accepted by the World Spider Catalog :

Dictis

Dictis L. Koch, 1872
 D. denticulata Dankittipakul & Singtripop, 2010 — Thailand
 D. elongata Dankittipakul & Singtripop, 2010 — Thailand
 D. ganeshi Keswani, 2015 — India
 D. mumbaiensis Ahmed, Satam, Khalap & Mohan, 2015 — India
 D. striatipes L. Koch, 1872 (type) — Japan, Korea, China to Australia, French Polynesia
 D. thailandica Dankittipakul & Singtripop, 2010 — Thailand

Scyloxes

Scyloxes Dunin, 1992
 S. asiatica Dunin, 1992 (type) — Tajikistan

Scytodes

Scytodes Latreille, 1804
 S. adisi Rheims & Brescovit, 2009 — Brazil
 S. aethiopica Simon, 1907 — Ethiopia
 S. affinis Kulczyński, 1901 — Ethiopia
 S. aharonii Strand, 1914 — Israel
 S. akytaba Rheims & Brescovit, 2006 — Brazil
 S. alayoi Alayón, 1977 — Mexico, Cuba
 S. albiapicalis Strand, 1907 — China
 S. alcomitzli Rheims, Brescovit & Durán-Barrón, 2007 — Mexico
 S. alfredi Gajbe, 2004 — India
 S. altamira Rheims & Brescovit, 2000 — Brazil
 S. annulipes Simon, 1907 — Algeria, Tunisia, Libya
 S. antonina Rheims & Brescovit, 2009 — Brazil
 S. apuecatu Rheims & Brescovit, 2006 — Brazil
 S. arboricola Millot, 1946 — Ivory Coast
 S. arenacea Purcell, 1904 — Namibia, South Africa
 S. armata Brescovit & Rheims, 2001 — Costa Rica
 S. aruensis Strand, 1911 — Indonesia (Aru Is.)
 S. arwa Rheims, Brescovit & van Harten, 2006 — Yemen, Iran
 S. atlacamani Rheims, Brescovit & Durán-Barrón, 2007 — Mexico
 S. atlacoya Rheims, Brescovit & Durán-Barrón, 2007 — Mexico
 S. atlatonin Rheims, Brescovit & Durán-Barrón, 2007 — Mexico
 S. auricula Rheims & Brescovit, 2000 — Brazil
 S. balbina Rheims & Brescovit, 2000 — Brazil
 S. becki Rheims & Brescovit, 2001 — Brazil
 S. bertheloti Lucas, 1838 — Mediterranean to Turkmenistan
 S. bilqis Rheims, Brescovit & van Harten, 2006 — Yemen
 S. blanda Bryant, 1940 — Cuba
 S. bocaina Rheims & Brescovit, 2009 — Brazil
 S. bonito Rheims & Brescovit, 2009 — Brazil
 S. brignolii Rheims & Brescovit, 2009 — Brazil
 S. broomi Pocock, 1902 — Namibia, South Africa
 S. brunnea González-Sponga, 2004 — Venezuela
 S. caffra Purcell, 1904 — South Africa
 S. caipora Rheims & Brescovit, 2004 — Brazil
 S. camerunensis Strand, 1906 — Cameroon
 S. canariensis Wunderlich, 1987 — Canary Is.
 S. caratinga Rheims & Brescovit, 2009 — Brazil
 S. caure Rheims & Brescovit, 2004 — Brazil
 S. cavernarum Roewer, 1962 — Malaysia
 S. cedri Purcell, 1904 — South Africa
 S. cellularis Simon, 1907 — Congo
 S. championi F. O. Pickard-Cambridge, 1899 — Mexico to Brazil
 S. chantico Rheims, Brescovit & Durán-Barrón, 2007 — Mexico
 S. chapeco Rheims & Brescovit, 2009 — Brazil
 S. chiconahui Rheims, Brescovit & Durán-Barrón, 2007 — Mexico
 S. chiquimula Brescovit & Rheims, 2001 — Guatemala
 S. chopim Rheims & Brescovit, 2009 — Brazil
 S. clavata Benoit, 1965 — Congo
 S. cogu Brescovit & Rheims, 2001 — Costa Rica
 S. congoanus Strand, 1908 — Congo
 S. constellata Lawrence, 1938 — South Africa
 S. coronata Thorell, 1899 — West Africa
 S. cotopitoka Rheims, Barreiros, Brescovit & Bonaldo, 2005 — Brazil
 S. cubensis Alayón, 1977 — Cuba, Trinidad
 S. curimaguana González-Sponga, 2004 — Venezuela
 S. curupira Rheims & Brescovit, 2004 — Brazil
 S. darlingtoni Alayón, 1977 — Cuba
 S. diminuta Valerio, 1981 — Costa Rica
 S. dissimulans Petrunkevitch, 1929 — Puerto Rico
 S. dollfusi Millot, 1941 — Ivory Coast
 S. domhelvecio Rheims & Brescovit, 2009 — Brazil
 S. dorothea Gertsch, 1935 — USA
 S. drakensbergensis Lawrence, 1947 — South Africa
 S. edwardsi Barrion, Barrion-Dupo & Heong, 2013 — China (Hainan)
 S. eleonorae Rheims & Brescovit, 2001 — Brazil
 S. elizabethae Purcell, 1904 — South Africa
 S. farri Alayón, 1985 — Jamaica
 S. flagellata Purcell, 1904 — South Africa
 S. florifera Yin & Xu, 2012 — China
 S. fourchei Lessert, 1939 — Central, East Africa
 S. fusca Walckenaer, 1837 — Central and Southern America. Introduced to Europe, tropical Africa, Seychelles, Myanmar, China, Japan, Hawaii
 S. genebra Rheims & Brescovit, 2009 — Brazil
 S. gertschi Valerio, 1981 — Panama
 S. gilva (Thorell, 1887) — India, Myanmar
 S. globula Nicolet, 1849 — Bolivia, Brazil, Argentina, Uruguay, Chile
 S. gooldi Purcell, 1904 — South Africa
 S. grammocephala Simon, 1909 — Vietnam
 S. guapiassu Rheims & Brescovit, 2009 — Brazil
 S. guttipes Simon, 1893 — Venezuela, Trinidad
 S. hahahae Rheims & Brescovit, 2001 — Brazil
 S. humilis L. Koch, 1875 — Ethiopia
 S. iabaday Rheims & Brescovit, 2001 — Brazil
 S. iara Rheims & Brescovit, 2004 — Brazil
 S. ilhota Rheims & Brescovit, 2009 — Brazil
 S. imbituba Rheims & Brescovit, 2009 — Brazil
 S. immaculata L. Koch, 1875 — Egypt, Greece
 S. insperata Soares & Camargo, 1948 — Brazil
 S. intricata Banks, 1909 — Mexico to Costa Rica
 S. itabaiana Rheims & Brescovit, 2009 — Brazil
 S. itacuruassu Rheims & Brescovit, 2006 — Brazil
 S. itapecerica Rheims & Brescovit, 2009 — Brazil
 S. itapevi Brescovit & Rheims, 2000 — Brazil
 S. itzana Chamberlin & Ivie, 1938 — Mexico
 S. itzli Rheims, Brescovit & Durán-Barrón, 2007 — Mexico
 S. janauari Brescovit & Höfer, 1999 — Brazil
 S. jousseaumei Simon, 1907 — Djibouti
 S. jurubatuba Rheims & Brescovit, 2009 — Brazil
 S. jurupari Rheims & Brescovit, 2004 — Brazil
 S. jyapara Rheims & Brescovit, 2006 — Brazil
 S. kaokoensis Lawrence, 1928 — Namibia
 S. karrooica Purcell, 1904 — South Africa
 S. kinsukus Patel, 1975 — India
 S. kinzelbachi Wunderlich, 1995 — Turkey, Jordan
 S. kumonga Zamani & Marusik, 2020 — Iran
 S. lanceolata Purcell, 1904 — South Africa
 S. lawrencei Lessert, 1939 — Central, East Africa
 S. leipoldti Purcell, 1904 — South Africa
 S. leprosula Strand, 1913 — Central Africa
 S. lesserti Millot, 1941 — Guinea
 S. lewisi Alayón, 1985 — Jamaica
 S. lineatipes Taczanowski, 1874 — Venezuela to Paraguay
 S. liui Wang, 1994 — China
 S. longipes Lucas, 1844 — Central and South America. Introduced to Guinea, DR Congo, Indonesia (New Guinea), Japan, Australia (Queensland), Pacific Is., Hawaii
 S. l. simplex Franganillo, 1926 — Cuba
 S. lorenzoi Alayón, 1977 — Cuba
 S. lugubris (Thorell, 1887) — Tropical Asia. Introduced to Hawaii, Mexico
 S. luteola Simon, 1893 — Venezuela
 S. lycosella Purcell, 1904 — South Africa
 S. lyriformis Purcell, 1904 — South Africa
 S. magna Bristowe, 1952 — Malaysia
 S. major Simon, 1886 — Africa
 S. makeda Rheims, Brescovit & van Harten, 2006 — Yemen, Oman, Iran
 S. mangabeiras Rheims & Brescovit, 2009 — Brazil
 S. mapia Rheims & Brescovit, 2000 — Brazil
 S. mapinguari Rheims & Brescovit, 2004 — Brazil
 S. maquine Rheims & Brescovit, 2009 — Brazil
 S. maresi Rheims & Brescovit, 2001 — Brazil
 S. maritima Lawrence, 1938 — South Africa
 S. marlieria Rheims & Brescovit, 2009 — Brazil
 S. maromba Rheims & Brescovit, 2009 — Brazil
 S. marshalli Pocock, 1902 — South Africa
 S. martiusi Brescovit & Höfer, 1999 — Brazil
 S. mawphlongensis Tikader, 1966 — India, Nepal, Thailand
 S. mayahuel Rheims, Brescovit & Durán-Barrón, 2007 — Mexico
 S. montana Purcell, 1904 — South Africa
 S. monticola González-Sponga, 2004 — Venezuela
 S. multilineata Thorell, 1899 — West, Central Africa
 S. nambiobyrassu Rheims & Brescovit, 2009 — Brazil
 S. nambiussu Rheims & Brescovit, 2006 — Brazil
 S. nanahuatzin Rheims, Brescovit & Durán-Barrón, 2007 — Mexico
 S. nigristernis Simon, 1907 — Guinea-Bissau
 S. noeli Alayón, 1977 — Cuba
 S. obelisci Denis, 1947 — Egypt
 S. opoxtli Rheims, Brescovit & Durán-Barrón, 2007 — Mexico
 S. oswaldi Lenz, 1891 — Madagascar
 S. paarmanni Brescovit & Höfer, 1999 — Brazil
 S. pallida Doleschall, 1859 — India, China, Philippines, New Guinea
 S. panamensis Brescovit & Rheims, 2001 — Panama
 S. panguana Brescovit & Höfer, 1999 — Peru
 S. paramera González-Sponga, 2004 — Venezuela
 S. pholcoides Simon, 1898 — Seychelles
 S. pintodarochai Rheims & Brescovit, 2009 — Brazil
 S. piroca Rheims & Brescovit, 2000 — Brazil
 S. piyampisi Rheims, Barreiros, Brescovit & Bonaldo, 2005 — Brazil
 S. propinqua Stoliczka, 1869 — Pakistan, India
 S. pulchella Berland, 1914 — East Africa
 S. punctipes Simon, 1907 — São Tomé and Príncipe
 S. quarta Lawrence, 1927 — Namibia
 S. quattuordecemmaculata Strand, 1907 — China
 S. quinqua Lawrence, 1927 — Namibia
 S. redempta Chamberlin, 1924 — Mexico
 S. reticulata Jézéquel, 1964 — Ivory Coast
 S. robertoi Alayón, 1977 — Cuba
 S. rubra Lawrence, 1937 — South Africa
 S. ruizensis Strand, 1914 — Colombia
 S. rupestris González-Sponga, 2004 — Venezuela
 S. saaristoi Rheims & Brescovit, 2009 — Brazil
 S. saci Rheims & Brescovit, 2004 — Brazil
 S. sansibarica Strand, 1907 — Tanzania (Zanzibar)
 S. schultzei Purcell, 1908 — South Africa
 S. semipullata (Simon, 1909) — Tibet
 S. seppoi Bosmans & Van Keer, 2014 — Algeria, Tunisia
 S. sexstriata Roewer, 1960 — Afghanistan
 S. silvatica Purcell, 1904 — South Africa
 S. sincora Rheims & Brescovit, 2009 — Brazil
 S. skuki Rheims & Brescovit, 2001 — Brazil
 S. socialis Miller, 2006 — Madagascar
 S. sordida Dyal, 1935 — Pakistan
 S. stoliczkai Simon, 1897 — India
 S. strandi Spassky, 1941 — Iran, Central Asia
 S. strussmannae Rheims & Brescovit, 2001 — Brazil
 S. subadulta Strand, 1911 — Indonesia (Aru Is.)
 S. subulata Purcell, 1904 — South Africa
 S. symmetrica Lawrence, 1938 — South Africa
 S. tabuleiro Rheims & Brescovit, 2009 — Brazil
 S. tacapepucu Rheims & Brescovit, 2006 — Brazil
 S. tapacura Rheims & Brescovit, 2009 — Brazil
 S. tapuia Rheims & Brescovit, 2009 — Brazil
 S. tardigrada Thorell, 1881 — Myanmar, New Guinea, Australia (Queensland)
 S. tegucigalpa Brescovit & Rheims, 2001 — Honduras
 S. tenerifensis Wunderlich, 1987 — Canary Is.
 S. tertia Lawrence, 1927 — Angola, Namibia
 S. testudo Purcell, 1904 — South Africa
 S. tezcatlipoca Rheims, Brescovit & Durán-Barrón, 2007 — Mexico
 S. thoracica (Latreille, 1802) (type) — Europe, North Africa, Turkey, Iran, temperate Asia to China, Korea, Japan. Introduced to North America, Argentina, South Africa, India, Australia, New Zealand
 S. tinkuan Rheims & Brescovit, 2004 — Brazil
 S. tlaloc Rheims, Brescovit & Durán-Barrón, 2007 — Mexico
 S. triangulifera Purcell, 1904 — South Africa
 S. trifoliata Lawrence, 1938 — South Africa
 S. tropofila González-Sponga, 2004 — Venezuela
 S. turvo Rheims & Brescovit, 2009 — Brazil
 S. tuyucua Brescovit, Rheims & Raizer, 2004 — Brazil
 S. tyaia Rheims & Brescovit, 2009 — Brazil
 S. tyaiamiri Rheims & Brescovit, 2006 — Brazil
 S. tyaiapyssanga Rheims & Brescovit, 2006 — Brazil
 S. tzitzimime Rheims, Brescovit & Durán-Barrón, 2007 — Mexico
 S. uligocetes Valerio, 1981 — Costa Rica
 S. una Rheims & Brescovit, 2009 — Brazil
 S. univittata Simon, 1882 — Egypt, Iran, India, Turkmenia, Kirghizia. Introduced to Hawaii, Mexico, Cuba, Venezuela, Brazil, Paraguay, Chile, Canary Is., Spain
 S. u. unilineata Thorell, 1887 — Myanmar
 S. upia Rheims & Brescovit, 2006 — Brazil
 S. vassununga Rheims & Brescovit, 2009 — Brazil
 S. vaurieorum Brescovit & Rheims, 2001 — Mexico, Guatemala
 S. velutina Heineken & Lowe, 1832 — Mediterranean, Cape Verde Is., Seychelles
 S. venusta (Thorell, 1890) — Sri Lanka to Indonesia (Java). Introduced to the Netherlands
 S. vieirae Rheims & Brescovit, 2000 — Brazil
 S. vittata Keyserling, 1877 — Colombia, Brazil
 S. xai Rheims & Brescovit, 2006 — Brazil
 S. ybyrapesse Rheims & Brescovit, 2006 — Brazil
 S. yphanta Wang, 1994 — China
 S. yssaiapari Rheims & Brescovit, 2006 — Brazil
 S. ytu Rheims & Brescovit, 2009 — Brazil
 S. zamena Wang, 1994 — China
 S. zamorano Brescovit & Rheims, 2001 — Honduras
 S. zapatana Gertsch & Mulaik, 1940 — USA

Soeuria

Soeuria Saaristo, 1997
 S. soeur Saaristo, 1997 (type) — Seychelles

Stedocys

Stedocys Ono, 1995
 S. amamiensis Suguro, 2019 — Japan
 S. gaolingensis Wu & Li, 2017 — China
 S. huangniuensis Wu & Li, 2017 — China
 S. leopoldi (Giltay, 1935) — Malaysia, Thailand
 S. ludiyanensis Wu & Li, 2017 — China
 S. matuoensis Wu & Li, 2017 — China
 S. pagodas Labarque, Grismado, Ramírez, Yan & Griswold, 2009 — China
 S. pulianensis Wu & Li, 2017 — China
 S. shilinensis Wu & Li, 2017 — China
 S. uenorum Ono, 1995 (type) — Thailand
 S. xiangzhouensis Wu & Li, 2017 — China
 S. xianrenensis Wu & Li, 2017 — China
 S. zhaoi Wu & Li, 2017 — Thailand

References

Scytodidae